Blake Sims (born January 4, 1991) is a former American football quarterback. He played college football at Alabama and was the Crimson Tide's starting quarterback in 2014.

Early years
Sims attended Gainesville High School in Gainesville, Georgia, where he played football and ran track his junior and senior seasons. He attended and played for Cass High School his freshman and sophomore years, starting as a sophomore. At Gainesville, played quarterback for head coach Bruce Miller, leading Gainesville to a 14–1 record and a state runner-up finish. He threw for 2,785 yards as a junior in 2008 while rushing for 822 yards and 15 scores. As a senior, he threw for 2,288 yards with 28 touchdowns, and rushed for 863 yards and 13 touchdowns. He twice earned AAA All-State honors by The Atlanta Journal-Constitution and the Associated Press (AP) in 2009.

In track & field, Sims was one of the state's top sprinters. At the 2009 Gainesville Tri Meet vs Buford/Clarke Central, he won the long jump event, recording a jump of 6.58 meters. At the '2009 "Flowery Branch, West Hall, Johnson, Gainesville, Chestatee Meet", he earned first-place finishes in both the 100 meters (10.85 s) and 200 meters (21.84 s). He won the 100 meters at the 2010 Battle at The Branch Invitational, at 10.84. He had a personal-best time of 10.69 seconds in the 100 meters.

Regarded as a four-star recruit by Rivals.com, Sims was ranked as the No. 33 athlete in the nation. He was also rated eighth in the AJC's 2010 Top 50 prospects in Georgia, No. 43 player by SuperPrep. He chose Alabama over scholarship offers from Tennessee, Georgia, FSU and Michigan.

College career
After spending 2010 to 2013 as a running back and backup quarterback, Sims started his first career game during the opener of his senior season in 2014 after beating Jake Coker for the job. On September 20, 2014, he threw for 445 yards against Florida, which was the second most in school history behind Scott Hunter's 484 in 1969. On December 6, 2014, Sims broke the Alabama single season passing yards record, which was previously held by A. J. McCarron. In 14 starts, he passed for 3,487 yards, 28 touchdowns and 10 interceptions. He lost in the semifinals to Ohio State, which later won the championship.

College statistics

Professional career

Sims was not drafted in the 2015 NFL Draft, thus becoming a free agent. He was offered an opportunity to try out with the Green Bay Packers and the Washington Redskins as a running back. He was not offered a contract by either team.

Toronto Argonauts 
Sims was signed by the Toronto Argonauts of the Canadian Football League on May 28, 2015 and released June 7, 2015.

Saskatchewan Roughriders 
Sims was signed by the Saskatchewan Roughriders of the Canadian Football League on July 29, 2015. He was cut September 15, 2015, having been on the active roster for one game. Roughriders traded quarterback Kevin Glenn to the Montreal Alouettes October 14, 2015, and Sims was re-signed to replace Glenn. He did not appear in any games for the Roughriders and was released on December 15, 2015.

Wollongong Devils 
In July 2016, Sims left North America for Australia to continue his professional football career with the Wollongong Devils of the National Gridiron League.

Atlanta Falcons 
On September 13, 2016, Sims was signed to the Falcons' practice squad. He was released on September 23.

Tampa Bay Buccaneers
On December 28, 2016, Sims was signed to the Tampa Bay Buccaneers' practice squad. He signed a reserve/future contract with the Buccaneers on January 2, 2017. He was waived on August 28, 2017.

Birmingham Iron
After his release by the Buccaneers, Sims was assigned to the Birmingham Iron of the Alliance of American Football. In the league's quarterback draft on November 27, he was retained by the Iron with their second-round selection. He was placed on injured reserve on February 27, 2019, and waived from injured reserve on April 1, 2019.

Frisco Fighters
On February 27, 2022, Sims signed with the Frisco Fighters of the Indoor Football League. On August 25, 2022, Sims would retire from professional football.

References

External links
Alabama Crimson Tide bio
Toronto Argonauts bio

1992 births
Living people
People from Gainesville, Georgia
Sportspeople from the Atlanta metropolitan area
Players of American football from Georgia (U.S. state)
African-American players of American football
American football quarterbacks
American football running backs
Alabama Crimson Tide football players
Atlanta Falcons players
Tampa Bay Buccaneers players
Birmingham Iron players
American players of Canadian football
Canadian football quarterbacks
Toronto Argonauts players
Saskatchewan Roughriders players
21st-century African-American sportspeople